John Patton may refer to:
John Patton (Pennsylvania politician) (1823–1897), U.S. Representative from the U.S. state of Pennsylvania
John Patton (Wyoming politician) (1930–2015), member of the Wyoming House of Representatives
John Patton (Detroit mayor) (1822–1900), mayor of Detroit, Michigan, 1858–1859
John Patton Jr. (1850–1907), U.S. Senator from the U.S. state of Michigan
John Patton (musician) (1935–2002), soul jazz organ player
John Patton (colonel) (1745–1804), Pennsylvania officer in the American Revolutionary War
John M. Patton (1797–1858), U.S. Representative from the U.S. state of Virginia
John M. Patton (Minnesota politician) (1928–2010), American politician
John Denniston Patton (1829–1904), U.S. Representative from the U.S. state of Pennsylvania
John Patton (GC) (1915–1996), Canadian recipient of the George Cross
John Sparks Patton (1894–1961), Louisiana politician and educator

See also
John Paton (disambiguation)
John Patten (disambiguation)